Hitler's War in the East, 1941−1945: A Critical Assessment is a 1997 book by the German historians Rolf-Dieter Müller and Gerd R. Ueberschär. It surveys the literature on the Soviet–German war of 1941−1945 from the German perspective. Writing in the introduction to the 2002 edition, Gerhard Weinberg describes the book as providing a broad coverage of the conflict, by "stressing ideological and political as well as more specifically military aspects". The book has been updated in subsequent editions, the latest having been issued in 2009.

Structure
The book devotes most of its space to the (West) German literature regarding the Soviet–German war. The authors also provide coverage of publications by British and American historians, while noting some Soviet and East German works, which they treat with caution. Some space is devoted to publications issued in post-Soviet Eastern Europe.

The book is divided into five parts: Policy and Strategy; The Military Campaign; The Ideologically Motivated War of Annihilation in the East; The Occupation; and The Results of the War and Coming to Terms with Them. Each section begins with a historiographical essay and ends with a bibliography. One reviewer was "particularly impressed by Müller and Ueberschar's thorough treatment of the Holocaust and the German occupation of the Soviet Union" and the ensuing historiographical controversies.

Reception
Dennis Showalter, in a review of the third (2009) edition for The Journal of Slavic Military Studies describes the book as "the standard reference in the field" since its publication. The book has been updated since 1997 with new sources that have been published through 2006. Frank Buscher of Aurora University praises the book for its accessibility and compelling presentation of historiography on the subject,

According to Buscher in his review, the book as "a 'must-read' for anyone with an interest in the Second World War and particularly the Eastern Front".

See also
The Myth of the Eastern Front: The Nazi-Soviet War in American Popular Culture
The Wehrmacht: History, Myth, Reality

References

Citations

Bibliography

External links
Official book page at the Berghahn Books web site

2009 non-fiction books
1997 non-fiction books
21st-century history books
20th-century history books
Aftermath of World War II in Germany
History books about World War II
Historiography of World War II
History books about Nazi Germany
Wehrmacht
German non-fiction books
Berghahn Books books